Robert Budi Hartono is an Indonesian tobacco billionaire with a 2018 net worth of US$12.6 billion. He owns and runs the privately held Djarum, the world's third largest maker of clove cigarettes. Djarum has reportedly recently grabbed shares from the number two cigarette firm, Sampoerna. Budi Hartono also has a stake with his brother, Michael Bambang Hartono in one of Indonesia's biggest banks, Bank Central Asia, formerly controlled by billionaire Liem Sioe Liong.  In 2020, according to American business magazine, Forbes, Budi Hartono's net worth reportedly reached US$22.3 billion and he was noted as the richest Indonesian and 71st richest person in the world.

Career 
Starting from Mr. Oei Wie Gwan bought a small business in the field named Djarum clove gramophone. In 1951 it changed its name to Djarum. Oei began marketing cigarettes under the brand "Djarum" which turned out to be successful in the market. After a fire nearly gutted the company in 1963 (Oei died shortly afterward), Djarum back up and modernize their equipment in the factory. In 1972 Djarum began to export their product abroad. Three years later the brand Djarum Djarum Filter was introduced, the first brand to be produced by machines, followed by the brand Djarum Super, introduced in 1981.

Together with his brother, Michael Hartono, at the age of 22 Robert inherited one of the leading cigarette company today, Djarum. Djarum was previously a small business called Djarum gramophone which was later purchased by his father, Oei Wie Gwan, in 1951 and changed its name to Djarum. Robert and his brother inherited Djarum after his father died. At that time, Djarum's factory burned down and suffered an unstable condition. But in the hands of the two Hartono brothers, Djarum could grow into giants.

In a September 2019 billionaires' personal information, Budi Hartono and his brother Michael Hartono were reported by Forbes magazine as the richest men in Indonesia in 2019 with a combined wealth of $US 35 billion.  Budi Hartono was listed by Forbes as being worth $US 18.6 billion, while in 2012 was $US 6.5 billion.

Personal life

Early life
Robert Budi Hartono (born on 28 April 1941) was born in 1941 at the city of Semarang, Central Java, Dutch East Indies and was the 2nd child of Oei Wie Gwan and Goei Tjo Nio. His brother, Michael Bambang Hartono was born in 1939.

Present life
He is married with three children and lives in Kudus, Indonesia.

References

External links 
Forbes 2004
UNOITC.org Home
Bank for International Settlements
Structure

Indonesian people of Chinese descent
Indonesian businesspeople
Living people
Indonesian billionaires
Diponegoro University alumni
Businesspeople in the tobacco industry
1941 births
R Budi